Spirit Mountain, known as Avi Kwa' Ame in Mojave, is a mountain within the Lake Mead National Recreation Area near Laughlin, Nevada. It is listed on the United States National Register of Historic Places as a sacred place to Native American tribes in Southern Nevada.

History
Environmentalists have sought designation of a significant area to the west of the mountain as a national monument. The Avi Kwa Ame National Monument would be named after the peak as the mountain is visible from almost the entire area.

Description 
Spirit Mountain is the center of creation for all Yuman speaking tribes and is considered a sacred area.

The mountain was listed on the National Register of Historic Places as a Traditional Cultural Property on September 8, 1999.

References

External links 
 
 

Mountains of Nevada
Religious places of the indigenous peoples of North America
Sacred mountains
Mojave Desert
Mountains of Clark County, Nevada
National Register of Historic Places in Clark County, Nevada
Properties of religious function on the National Register of Historic Places in Nevada
Natural features on the National Register of Historic Places